Vladimir Volkov (born 6 June 1986) is a retired professional footballer. Born in Serbia, Volkov represented Montenegro internationally.

Club career

Early career
Born in Serbian capital Belgrade, back then still Yugoslav capital, Volkov started playing football in youth categories of FK Radnički Beograd when he was seven years old. Later, already as a senior, he played for FK BSK Borča from 2006 to early 2008, when he was moved to Portimonense. After that, Volkov spent the first part of the 2008–09 season with OFK Beograd, before moving to Moldovan champions FC Sheriff Tiraspol in 2009.

Partizan
Volkov was transferred to FK Partizan before the end of the 2010–11 season, signing a three-year contract on 14 May 2011. He quickly established himself as first choice of coaches Aleksandar Stanojević and Avram Grant mostly because of his good games in qualification stages of 2011–12 UEFA Champions League.

Mechelen
In summer 2015, Volkov signed a two-year deal with Belgian side Mechelen. He was officially presented the following day and was given the number 3 shirt.

Lech Poznań
On 30 January 2016 he was loaned to Lech Poznań on a half-year deal.

Radnički Niš
On 13 January 2017, Volkov signed with Radnički Niš. The official presentation was on January 17 at club media-center, where Volkov, Anid Travančić and Ryota Noma were presented as the first signings of the winter-break and crucial reinforcements of Radnički for the second half of the 2016–17 Serbian SuperLiga.

Rad
In January 2019, Volkov joined FK Rad.

International career
On 4 November 2011, the caretaker of the Serbian national team Radovan Ćurčić, called-up Volkov for two friendly matches against Mexico and Honduras. He debuted on 15 November, playing the full match against Honduras.

Under new FIFA rules, a player who has dual citizenship and has played only one match for one of the two countries can change the decision to play for the other national team. As the Serbian national team "showed no interest", Volkov accepted Brnović's call to join the Montenegrin national team. On 25 May 2012, Volkov made a debut for the Montenegrin national team as a starter in a friendly match against Belgium. He earned a total of 17 caps, scoring no goals. His final international was a September 2015 European Championship qualification match against Liechtenstein.

Personal life
Born in Belgrade, Volkov grown up in the urban municipality New Belgrade along with Pavle Ninkov and Ivan Čvorović. As a coincidence, all of them represented different national teams. Vladimir's paternal great-grandparents migrated from Russia to Serbia in 1917. Besides his native Serbian, he also speaks English, Portuguese and Russian. As of 2017, he is in a relationship with Serbian singer Sandra Afrika.

Career statistics

Honours
Sheriff Tiraspol
Moldovan National Division: 2008–09, 2009–10
Moldovan Cup: 2008–09, 2009–10
CIS Cup: 2009

Partizan
Serbian SuperLiga: 2011–12, 2012–13, 2014–15

References

External links

Player profile on Serbian National Team page
Vladimir Volkov at utakmica.rs

1986 births
Living people
Footballers from Belgrade
Montenegrin people of Russian descent
Montenegrin people of Serbian descent
Serbian people of Russian descent
Association football fullbacks
Association football wingers
Association football utility players
Serbia and Montenegro footballers
Serbian footballers
Serbia international footballers
Montenegrin footballers
Montenegro international footballers
Dual internationalists (football)
RFK Grafičar Beograd players
FK Železničar Beograd players
FK BSK Borča players
Portimonense S.C. players
OFK Beograd players
FC Sheriff Tiraspol players
FK Partizan players
K.V. Mechelen players
Lech Poznań players
FK Radnički Niš players
FK Rad players
Ermis Aradippou FC players
FK Borac Banja Luka players
Serbian First League players
Liga Portugal 2 players
Serbian SuperLiga players
Moldovan Super Liga players
Belgian Pro League players
Ekstraklasa players
Cypriot First Division players
Premier League of Bosnia and Herzegovina players
Montenegrin expatriate footballers
Serbian expatriate footballers
Expatriate footballers in Portugal
Serbian expatriate sportspeople in Portugal
Montenegrin expatriate sportspeople in Portugal
Expatriate footballers in Moldova
Serbian expatriate sportspeople in Moldova
Montenegrin expatriate sportspeople in Moldova
Expatriate footballers in Belgium
Serbian expatriate sportspeople in Belgium
Montenegrin expatriate sportspeople in Belgium
Expatriate footballers in Poland
Serbian expatriate sportspeople in Poland
Montenegrin expatriate sportspeople in Poland
Expatriate footballers in Cyprus
Serbian expatriate sportspeople in Cyprus
Montenegrin expatriate sportspeople in Cyprus
Expatriate footballers in Bosnia and Herzegovina
Serbian expatriate sportspeople in Bosnia and Herzegovina
Montenegrin expatriate sportspeople in Bosnia and Herzegovina